The year 1983 saw both the official beginning of the Internet and the first mobile cellular telephone call.

Events

January
 January 1 – The migration of the ARPANET to TCP/IP is officially completed (this is considered to be the beginning of the true Internet).
 January 24 – Twenty-five members of the Red Brigades are sentenced to life imprisonment for the 1978 murder of Italian politician Aldo Moro.
 January 25 
 High-ranking Nazi war criminal Klaus Barbie is arrested in Bolivia.
 IRAS is launched from Vandenberg AFB, to conduct the world's first all-sky infrared survey from space.

February
 February 2 – Giovanni Vigliotto goes on trial on charges of polygamy involving 105 women.
 February 3 – Prime Minister of Australia Malcolm Fraser is granted a double dissolution of both houses of parliament, for elections on March 5, 1983. As Fraser is being granted the dissolution, Bill Hayden resigns as leader of the Australian Labor Party, and in the subsequent leadership spill Bob Hawke is elected as Hayden's successor unopposed.
 February 5–6 – The team of A. J. Foyt, Preston Henn, Bob Wollek and Claude Ballot-Léna win the 24 Hours of Daytona automobile race in a Porsche 935
 February 6 – Klaus Barbie is officially charged with war crimes.
 February 12 – 100 women protest in Lahore, Pakistan, against military dictator Zia-ul-Haq's proposed Law of Evidence. The women are tear-gassed, baton-charged and thrown into lock-up but are successful in repealing the law.
 February 16 – The Ash Wednesday bushfires in Victoria and South Australia claim the lives of 75 people, in one of Australia's worst bushfire disasters.
 February 18
 The Venezuelan bolívar is devalued and exchange controls are established in an event now referred to as Black Friday by many Venezuelans (the Bolívar had been the most stable and internationally accepted currency).
 Nellie massacre: Over 2,000 people, mostly Bangladeshi Muslims, are massacred in Assam, India, during the Assam agitation.
 Wah Mee massacre: 13 people are killed in an attempted robbery in the Chinatown area of Seattle, United States.

March
 March 1 – The Balearic Islands and Madrid become Autonomous communities of Spain.
 March 5 – Australian federal election: The Labor Party led by Bob Hawke defeats the Liberal/National Coalition Government led by Prime Minister Malcolm Fraser. Hawke would be sworn in on March 11. As soon as the results became clear, Fraser resigned from the Liberal leadership; he would be replaced by outgoing Minister for Industry and Commerce Andrew Peacock.
 March 9 – The 3D printer is invented by Chuck Hull.
 March 21 – Yamoussoukro officially becomes the Ivorian political capital after transfer from Abidjan.

April
 April 4 – The Space Shuttle Challenger is launched on its maiden voyage: STS-6.
 April 11 – Spain's Seve Ballesteros won the 47th PGA Masters Tournament
 April 18 – The 1983 United States embassy bombing in Beirut kills 63 people.
 April 22 – A reactor shut-down due to failure of fuel rods occurs at Kursk Nuclear Power Plant, Russia.

May
May 6 – Stern magazine publishes the "Hitler Diaries" (which are later found to be forgeries).
May 11 – Aberdeen F.C. beat Real Madrid 2–1 (after extra time) to win the European Cup Winners' Cup in 1983 and become only the third Scottish side to win a European trophy.
May 17 – Lebanon, Israel, and the United States sign an agreement on Israeli withdrawal from Lebanon.
May 20
 Two separate research groups led by Robert Gallo and Luc Montagnier independently declare that a novel retrovirus may have been infecting people with HIV/AIDS, and publish their findings in the same issue of the journal Science.
 Church Street bombing: A car bombing in Pretoria, South Africa, kills 19 people. The bomb has been planted by members of Umkhonto we Sizwe, a military wing of the African National Congress.
May 25 – Hamburger SV defeat Juventus 1-0 in the final of the European Cup.
May 26 – The 7.8  Sea of Japan earthquake shakes northern Honshu with a maximum Mercalli intensity of VIII (Severe). A destructive tsunami is generated that leaves about 100 people dead.
May 27 – Benton fireworks disaster. An explosion at an unlicensed and illegal fireworks operation near Benton, Tennessee, kills eleven and injures one.
May 28 – The 9th G7 summit begins at Williamsburg, Virginia, United States.

June
June 9 – Britain's Conservative government, led by Margaret Thatcher, is re-elected by a landslide majority.
June 13 – Pioneer 10 passes the orbit of Neptune, becoming the first man-made object to leave the vicinity of the major planets of the Solar System.
June 18 – Iranian teenager Mona Mahmudnizhad and nine other women are hanged because they are members of the Baháʼí Faith.
June 18–19 – The team of Vern Schuppan, Al Holbert and Hurley Haywood wins the 24 Hours of Le Mans.
June 22 - Emanuela Orlandi, a 15 years old Vatican girl, misteriously disappears in Rome while returning home from a music lesson. The disappearance of the girl led to many speculations which see the involving of international terrorism, italian organized crime and even a plot inside the Vatican to cover a sexual scandal inside the Holy See. Because of all these theories, the missing of Emanuela Orlandi would later become Italy's most famous unsolved mystery. 
June 25 – India wins the Cricket World Cup, defeating the West Indies by 43 runs.
June 30 – A total loss of coolant occurs at the Embalse Nuclear Power Station, Argentina. It is classified as an "Accident With Local Consequences" – level 4 on the International Nuclear Event Scale.

July 
July 1
A North Korean Ilyushin Il-62M jet, en route to Conakry Airport in Guinea, crashes into the Fouta Djall Mountains in Guinea-Bissau, killing all 23 people on board.
A technical failure causes the release of iodine-131 from the Philippsburg Nuclear Power Plant, Germany.
July 15
Nintendo's Family Computer, also known as the Famicom, goes on sale in Japan.
 The Orly Airport attack in Paris leaves eight dead and 55 injured.
 July 16 – Sikorsky S-61 disaster: A helicopter crashes off the Isles of Scilly, causing 20 fatalities.
 July 20 – The government of Poland announces the end of martial law and amnesty for political prisoners.
 July 21 – The lowest temperature on Earth is recorded in Vostok Station, Antarctica with −89.2 °C (−128.6 °F).
 July 22 – Australian Dick Smith completes his solo circumnavigation of the world in a helicopter.
 July 23
 13 Sri Lanka Army soldiers are killed after a deadly ambush by the militant Liberation Tigers of Tamil Eelam, starting the Sri Lankan Civil War which continued until 2009.
 Heavy rain and mudslides at western Shimane Prefecture, Japan, kill 117.
 July 24 – The Black July anti-Tamil riots begin in Sri Lanka, killing between 400 and 3,000. Black July is generally regarded as the beginning of the Sri Lankan Civil War.

August 
 August 4 – Thomas Sankara becomes President of Upper Volta.
 August 18
 Hurricane Alicia hits the Texas coast, killing 22 and causing over US$3.8 billion (2005 dollars) in damage.
 Five people are killed and 18 others injured when a road train is deliberately driven into a motel at Ayers Rock in the Northern Territory of Australia (the driver, Douglas Edward Crabbe, is convicted in March 1984).
 August 21 – Benigno Aquino Jr., Philippines opposition leader, is assassinated in Manila just as he returns from exile.
 August 26 – Heavy rain triggers flooding at Bilbao, Spain, and surrounding areas, killing 44 people and causing millions in damages.

September
 September 1 – Cold War: Korean Air Lines Flight 007 is shot down by Soviet Union Air Force Su-15 Flagon pilot Major Gennadi Osipovich near Moneron Island when the commercial aircraft enters Soviet airspace. All 269 on board are killed, including U.S. Congressman Larry McDonald.
 September 6 – The Soviet Union admits to shooting down Korean Air Lines Flight 007, stating that the pilots did not know it was a civilian aircraft when it violated Soviet airspace.
 September 19 – Saint Kitts and Nevis becomes an independent state.
 September 23
Gulf Air Flight 771 crashes in the United Arab Emirates after a bomb explodes in the baggage compartment, killing 117.
 Violence erupts in New Caledonia between native Kanaks and French expatriates. The French government withdraws the promise of independence.
 September 26
 1983 Soviet nuclear false alarm incident: Soviet military officer Stanislav Petrov averts a worldwide nuclear war by correctly identifying a warning of attack by U.S. missiles as a false alarm.
 The Soyuz T-10-1 mission ends in a pad abort at the Baikonur Cosmodrome, when a pad fire occurs at the base of the Soyuz U rocket during the launch countdown. The escape tower system, attached to the top of the capsule containing the crew and Soyuz spacecraft, fires immediately, pulling the crew safe from the vehicle a few seconds before the rocket explodes, destroying the launch complex.
 The Australian yacht Australia II wins the America's Cup, the first successful challenge to the New York Yacht Club's 132-year defence of the sailing trophy.
 September 27 – The GNU Project is announced publicly on the net.unix-wizards and net.usoft newsgroups.

October
 October 2 – Neil Kinnock is elected leader of the British Labour Party.
 October 4 – British entrepreneur Richard Noble sets a new land speed record of 633.468 mph (1,019.468 km/h), driving Thrust2 at the Black Rock Desert, Nevada.
 October 9 – The Rangoon bombing kills South Korea's Foreign Minister, Lee Bum Suk, and 21 others. The perpetrators are believed to be North Koreans.
 October 12 – Japan's former Prime Minister Kakuei Tanaka is found guilty of taking a $2 million bribe from Lockheed, and sentenced to 4 years in jail.
 October 13 – The world's first commercial mobile cellular telephone call is made, in Chicago, United States.
 October 19 – Maurice Bishop, Prime Minister of Grenada, and 40 others are assassinated in a military coup.
 October 21 – At the 17th General Conference on Weights and Measures, the metre is defined in terms of the speed of light as the distance light travels in a vacuum in 1/299,792,458 of a second.
 October 23 – Beirut barracks bombing: Simultaneous suicide truck-bombings destroy both the French Army and United States Marine Corps barracks in Beirut, killing 241 U.S. servicemen, 58 French paratroopers and 6 Lebanese civilians.
 October 25
 Invasion of Grenada by United States troops at the behest of Eugenia Charles of Dominica, a member of the Organization of American States.
 Word processor software Multi-Tool Word, soon to become Microsoft Word, is released in the United States. It is primarily the work of programmers Richard Brodie and Charles Simonyi. Free demonstration copies on disk are distributed with the November issue of PC World magazine.
 October 30 – Argentine general election: The first democratic elections in Argentina after seven years of military rule are held.

November
 November 2 – South Africa approves a new constitution granting limited political rights to Coloureds and Asians as part of a series of reforms to apartheid.
 November 3 – Commencement of the battle of Tripoli between Arafat loyalists and PLO dissidents.
 November 5 – Byford Dolphin rig diving bell accident: Off the coast of Norway, 5 divers are killed and 1 severely wounded in an explosive decompression accident.
 November 7 
 Able Archer 83: Many Soviet officials misinterpret this NATO exercise as a nuclear first strike, causing the last nuclear scare of the Cold War.
 1983 U.S. Senate bombing  A bomb explodes in the United States Senate with the intent to kill Republican senators; no one is injured. The perpetrators are members of the May 19th Communist Organization.
 November 11 – Ronald Reagan becomes the first U.S. president to address the National Diet, Japan's national legislature.
 November 13 – The first United States cruise missiles arrive at RAF Greenham Common in the UK amid protests from peace campaigners.
 November 14 – The immunosuppressant cyclosporine is approved by the FDA, leading to a revolution in the field of transplantation.
 November 15 – The Turkish part of Cyprus declares independence.
 November 17 – The Zapatista Army of National Liberation is founded in Mexico.
 November 19 – An attempted hijacking of Aeroflot Flight 6833 in Soviet Georgia results in several dead and wounded.
 November 27 – Colombian Avianca Flight 011 crashes near Barajas Airport in Madrid, Spain, killing 181 of the 192 on board.

December
 December 4 – General elections are celebrated in Venezuela in which the opposition party, Democratic Action, wins a majority in both chambers of the Venezuelan Congress and the presidency for the 1984–1989 period under Jaime Lusinchi. Voter turn out is 87.3% and Lusinchi obtains 58.4% of the votes.
 Solar eclipse of December 4, 1983.
 December 5 – ICIMOD is established and inaugurated with its headquarters in Kathmandu, Nepal, and legitimised through an Act of Parliament in Nepal this same year.
 December 7 – Two Spanish passenger planes collide on the foggy runway at a Madrid airport, killing 90 people.
 December 9 – The Australian dollar is floated, by Federal treasurer Paul Keating. Under the old flexible peg system, the Reserve Bank bought and sold all Australian dollars and cleared the market at the end of the day. This initiative is taken by the government of Bob Hawke.
 December 10 – Military rule ends and democracy is restored in Argentina, with the beginning of Raúl Alfonsín's first term as President of Argentina.
 December 13 – Turgut Özal, of ANAP forms the new government of Turkey (45th government); beginning a new civilian regime.
 December 17
 The Alcalá 20 nightclub fire in Madrid, Spain, injuring 47 and killing 83 people.
 Harrods bombings: a Provisional IRA car bomb kills 6 people and injures 90 outside Harrods department store in London.
 December 19 – The Jules Rimet Trophy is stolen from the Brazilian Soccer Confederation building in Rio de Janeiro. , the trophy has not been recovered.
 December 27 – Pope John Paul II visits Rebibbia prison to forgive his would-be assassin Mehmet Ali Ağca.
 December 31 – Two bombs explode in France: one on a Paris train kills 3 and injures 19; the other at Marseille station kills 2 and injures 34.

Date unknown
 Leopold Kohr, the people of Belau, Amory and Hunter Lovins/Rocky Mountain Institute and Manfred Max Neef/CEPAUR win the Right Livelihood Award.
 The meteorological 1982–83 El Niño event brings severe weather worldwide.

Births

January 
 January 2 – Kate Bosworth, American actress
 January 4
 Will Bynum, American basketball player
 Kerry Condon, Irish actress
 January 7 – Brett Dalton, American actor
 January 8
 Chen Xiexia, Chinese weightlifter 
 Chris Masters, American professional wrestler
 January 9 – Gala Évora, Spanish actress
 January 10 – Li Nina, Chinese aerial free-style skier
 January 12 – Manourou Gakou, French basketball player
 January 13
 Imran Khan, Bollywood actor
 Julian Morris, British actor
 Ronny Turiaf, French basketball player
 January 16
 Marwan Kenzari, Dutch actor
 Emanuel Pogatetz, Austrian footballer
 January 17 – Álvaro Arbeloa, Spanish football player and coach
 January 18
 Jung Yu-mi, South Korean actress 
 Samantha Mumba, Irish singer and actress
 January 19 
 Justyna Kowalczyk-Tekieli, Polish cross-country skier
 Øystein Pettersen, Norwegian Olympic cross-country skier
 Hikaru Utada, Japanese singer and songwriter 
 January 21  
 Svetlana Khodchenkova, Russian actress
 Maryse Ouellet, French-Canadian professional wrestler and glamour model
 January 23
 Justyna Kowalczyk, Polish cross-country skier
 Sarah Tait, Australian rower (d. 2016)
 January 24 
 Craig Horner, Australian actor
 Teo, Belarusian singer
 January 25 – Yasuyuki Konno, Japanese footballer
 January 28 – Chris Wondolowski, American soccer player
 January 30 – Belçim Bilgin, Turkish actress
 January 31 – Fabio Quagliarella, Italian footballer

February
 February 1 – Iveta Benešová, Czech tennis player
 February 2 
 Anastasia Davydova, Russian synchronised swimmer
 Carolina Klüft, Swedish athlete
 February 3 – Gabriel Sargissian, Armenian chess Grandmaster
 February 6
Sreesanth, Indian cricketer
Jamie Whincup, Australian racing driver
 February 7
 Elin Grindemyr, Swedish model
 Federico Marchetti, Italian footballer
 February 8
 Atiba Hutchinson, Canadian footballer
 Olga Syahputra, Indonesian actor, comedian, singer, and television presenter (d. 2015)
 February 10 
 Daiane dos Santos, Brazilian artistic gymnast
 Matej Tóth, Slovak racewalker
 February 11 
 Jared Isaacman, American entrepreneur, pilot, philanthropist, and commercial astronaut.
 Rafael van der Vaart, Dutch footballer
 February 12 – Iko Uwais Indonesian pencak silat actor
 February 15 – Philipp and David Degen, Swiss footballers
 February 16 – Agyness Deyn, English model and actress
 February 17
 Selita Ebanks, Caymanian model
 Elin Kling, Swedish fashion journalist
 Kevin Rudolf, American singer-songwriter and record producer
 February 19
 Kotoōshū Katsunori (born Kaloyan Stefanov Mahlyanov), Bulgarian sumo wrestler
 Mika Nakashima, Japanese singer and actress
 Nozomi Sasaki, Japanese voice actress
 Reynhard Sinaga, Indonesian rapist
 February 20
 Emad Moteab, Egyptian footballer
 Justin Verlander, American baseball player
 February 21 – Mélanie Laurent, French actress and director
 February 23
 Aziz Ansari, American comedian and actor
 Mirco Bergamasco, Italian rugby union player
 Emily Blunt, English actress
 Mido, Egyptian footballer
 February 25 – Eduardo da Silva, Brazilian born-Croatian soccer player 
 February 26 – Pepe, Brazilian born-Portuguese footballer
 February 27
 Devin Harris, American basketball player
 Kate Mara, American television and film actress
 Vítězslav Veselý, Czech javelin thrower

March 
 March 1 – Lupita Nyong'o, Mexican-born Kenyan-American Academy Award-winning actress
 March 6 – Giulia Quintavalle, Italian judoka
 March 8 – Maialen Chourraut, Spanish slalom canoeist
 March 9
 Clint Dempsey, American soccer player
 Maite Perroni, Mexican singer and actress
 March 10
 Ryu Hyun-kyung, South Korean actress
 Jonas Olsson, Swedish footballer
 Rafe Spall, English actor
 Carrie Underwood, American singer, songwriter, fashion designer and actress
 March 13 – Kaitlin Sandeno, American swimmer
 March 14
 Bakhtiyar Artayev, Kazakh boxer
 Taylor Hanson, American musician
 Vitaa, French singer
 March 15 – Parisa Liljestrand, Iranian born-Swedish politician 
 March 16 – Stephanie Gatschet, American actress
 March 17 
 Raul Meireles, Portuguese footballer
 Attila Vajda, Hungarian sprint canoeist
 March 18 – Stéphanie Cohen-Aloro, French tennis player
 March 20
 Eiji Kawashima, Japanese footballer
 Jenni Vartiainen, Finnish pop singer 
 March 23 – Mo Farah, Somali-born British athlete
 March 27 – Alina Devecerski, Swedish singer
 March 29
 Ezgi Mola, Turkish actress
 Ed Skrein, English actor and rapper
 March 30 – Hebe Tien, Taiwanese singer
 March 31
 Hashim Amla, South African cricketer
 Ashleigh Ball, Canadian voice actress, singer and musician

April
 April 1
 Matt Lanter, American actor and model
 Sergey Lazarev, Russian pop-singer
 Amr Zaki, Egyptian footballer
 April 2 – Oh Eun-seok, South Korean fencer 
 April 4 
 Ben Gordon, British basketball player
 Amanda Righetti, American actress and film producer
 April 6 – Diora Baird, American actress
 April 7 
 Andrea Fuentes, Spanish swimming coach and former synchronised swimmer
 Franck Ribéry, French footballer
 April 8 
 Edson Braafheid, Dutch footballer
 Anastasiya Yermakova, Russian synchronised swimmer
 April 9 – Lukáš Dlouhý, Czech tennis player
 April 10 – Jamie Chung, American actress
 April 12 – Jelena Dokić, Australian tennis player
 April 13 
 Claudio Bravo, Chilean footballer
 Schalk Burger, South African rugby player
 April 14 – Armando Torrea, Mexican actor 
 April 15
 Alice Braga, Brazilian actress
 Ilya Kovalchuk, Russian ice hockey player
 Matt Cardle, British singer
 April 16 
 Cat Osterman, American softball player
 Alex Antônio de Melo Santos, Brazilian footballer
 April 18 – Miguel Cabrera, Venezuelan baseball player
 April 20
 Sebastian Ingrosso, Swedish club DJ
 Miranda Kerr, Australian model
 April 21
 Paweł Brożek, Polish footballer
 Gugu Mbatha-Raw, British actress
 April 23
 Daniela Hantuchová, Slovakian tennis player
 Aaron Hill, American actor
 April 25 – Nick Willis, New Zealand middle distance runner
 April 29
 Megan Boone, American actress
 David Lee, American basketball player
 Yuriko Shiratori, Japanese actress and gravure idol
 April 30 – Yelena Leuchanka, Belarusian professional women's basketball player

May 
 May 1 – Alain Bernard, French Olympic swimmer
 May 2 – Tina Maze, Slovenian alpine ski racer
 May 3 – Myriam Fares, Lebanese singer, dancer and actress
 May 5 – Henry Cavill, British actor
 May 6
 Dani Alves, Brazilian footballer
 Adrianne Palicki, American actress
 Doron Perkins, American basketball player
 Gabourey Sidibe, American actress
 Raquel Zimmermann, Brazilian model
 May 7
 Marco Galiazzo, Italian archer
 Alexander Legkov, Russian cross country skier
 May 9 – Ryuhei Matsuda, Japanese actor
 May 11 – Holly Valance, Australian actress and singer
 May 12
 Alicja Bachleda-Curuś, Polish actress and singer
 Domhnall Gleeson, Irish actor and writer
 Alina Kabaeva, Russian rhythmic gymnast and politician
 Charilaos Pappas, Greek footballer
 May 13
 Anita Görbicz, Hungarian handball player
 Grégory Lemarchal, French singer (d. 2007)
 Yaya Touré, Ivorian footballer
 May 14
 Anahí, Mexican singer and actress
 Sarbel, Greek Cypriot pop singer
 Amber Tamblyn, American actress
 May 16
 Nancy Ajram, Lebanese singer
 Marcela Temer, First Lady of Brazil
 May 17 – Channing Frye, American basketball player
 May 20 
 Óscar Cardozo, Paraguayan footballer
 N. T. Rama Rao Jr., Indian actor and singer
 May 23 – Heidi Range, British singer (Sugababes)
 May 24 – Woo Seung-yeon, South Korean actress and model (d. 2009)
 May 31 – Zana Marjanović, Bosnian actress

June

 June 1 
 Sylvia Hoeks, Dutch actress
 Yara, Lebanese singer
 June 4 – Romaric, Ivorian footballer
 June 6 – Joe Rokocoko, New Zealand rugby union player
 June 8
 Kim Clijsters, Belgian tennis player
 Mamoru Miyano, Japanese voice actor
 June 10
 Marina Abrosimova, Russian pop singer
 Leelee Sobieski, American film and television actress
 June 12
 Bryan Habana, South African rugby union player
 Anja Rubik, Polish model
 June 13 – Jason Spezza, Canadian hockey player
 June 15 – Julia Fischer, German violinist and pianist
 June 16 
 Verónica Echegui, Spanish actress
 Klim Shipenko, Russian film director and producer
 June 17 – Kazunari Ninomiya, Japanese actor, idol, and singer
 June 19
 Macklemore, American rapper
 Tanja Mihhailova, Russian-Estonian pop singer and actress
 Mark Selby, British snooker player
 Aidan Turner, Irish actor
 June 20 – Cherrie Ying, Hong Kong actress
 June 21
 Edward Snowden, American computer specialist, CIA employee, and whistleblower
 Eduardo Hernández-Sonseca, Spanish basketball player
 June 22 
 Ágatha Bednarczuk, Brazilian beach volleyball player
 Bethe Correia, Brazilian mixed martial artist
 June 23 – Brandi Rhodes, American professional wrestler and reality television personality
 June 24 – Albert, 12th Prince of Thurn and Taxis
 June 25 
 Cleo, Polish singer
 Daniele Gastaldello, Italian footballer
 June 26
 Toyonoshima Daiki, Japanese sumo wrestler
 Felipe Melo, Brazilian footballer
 Fahad Mustafa, Pakistani actor
 June 27 
 Alsou, Russian singer, Eurovision Song Contest 2000 runner-up
 Ben Bocquelet, French-British animator and producer
 Ashley Hinson, American politician
 Nikola Rakočević, Serbian actor
 June 29 – Ilya Yashin, Russian activist and politician
 June 30 
 Cheryl, British singer (Girls Aloud) and TV personality
 Angela Sarafyan, Armenian born-American actress and model

July 

 July 1
 Sheilla Castro, Brazilian volleyball player
 Marit Larsen, Norwegian singer and songwriter
 Leeteuk, Korean singer (Super Junior)
 July 2 – Michelle Branch, American singer (The Wreckers)
 July 4 – Isabeli Fontana, Brazilian fashion model
 July 5 – Zheng Jie, Chinese tennis player
 July 7 
 Krzysztof Lijewski, Polish handballer
 Martin Wallström, Swedish actor
 July 10 
 Sherif Ekramy, Egyptian footballer
 Golshifteh Farahani, Iranian-French actress
 Kim Heechul, Korean actor and singer (Super Junior) 
 Boniface Mwangi, Kenyan photojournalist, politician and activist
 Barış Pehlivan, Turkish journalist and writer
 July 13
 Liu Xiang, Chinese athlete 
 Carmen Villalobos, Colombian actress and model
 July 14 – Igor Andreev, Russian tennis player
 July 15 
 Maxim Dondyuk, Ukrainian documentary photographer
 Cristián Muñoz Corrales, Chilean footballer
 July 16
 Katrina Kaif, Bollywood actress and model
 Duncan Keith, Canadian ice hockey player
 Eleanor Matsuura, Japanese-English actress
 July 17 – Flávia de Oliveira, Brazilian model
 July 18 
 Carlos Diogo, Uruguayan footballer
 Mikk Pahapill, Estonian decathlete
 July 19 – Prince Ernst August of Hanover
 July 21 – Eivør Pálsdóttir, Faroese singer and composer
 July 22
 Detsl, Russian musician (d. 2019)
 Ryan Doucette, Canadian actor
 Juliana Silva, Brazilian beach volleyball player
 Jonas Sakuwaha, Zambian footballer
 Sharni Vinson, Australian model, actress and dancer
 July 23 – Aaron Peirsol, American swimmer
 July 24
 Daniele De Rossi, Italian footballer
 Asami Mizukawa, Japanese actress
 Carsten Mogensen, Danish badminton player
 July 25 – Isobel Joyce, Irish cricketer
 July 27 
 Lorik Cana, Albanian footballer
 Goran Pandev, Macedonian footballer
 July 28 – Ilir Latifi, Swedish-Albanian mixed martial artist
 July 29 – Kaitlyn Black, American actress
 July 30 – Mariano Andújar, Argentine footballer

August 

 August 2 
 Michel Bastos, Brazilian footballer
 Hatice Şendil, Turkish actress and model
 August 3 – Mamie Gummer, American actress
 August 4
 Greta Gerwig, American actress and filmmaker
 Adhir Kalyan, South African actor
 Mariusz Wlazły, Polish volleyball player
 August 6 – Robin van Persie, Dutch footballer
 August 7 
 Christian Chávez, Mexican singer and actor
 Danny, Portuguese footballer
 August 9 – Ashley Johnson, American actress and voice actress
 August 11 – Chris Hemsworth, Australian actor
 August 12 – Klaas-Jan Huntelaar, Dutch footballer
 August 13 – Aleš Hemský, Czechoslovakian ice hockey player
 August 14
 Elena Baltacha, Ukrainian-Scottish tennis player (d. 2014)
 Sunidhi Chauhan, Indian playback singer
 Mila Kunis, Ukraine-born American actress
 Lu Yen-hsun, Taiwanese tennis player
 August 16 – Nikos Zisis, Greek basketball player
 August 17 – Dustin Pedroia, American baseball player
 August 18
 Kris Boyd, Scottish football player
 Mika, Lebanese-British singer
 Cameron White, Australian cricketer
 August 19
 Missy Higgins, Australian pop singer-songwriter, musician and actor
 Claudia Salinas, Mexican model and actress
 Reeva Steenkamp, South African model (d. 2013)
 Tammin Sursok, Australian actress
 August 20
 Andrew Garfield, British/American actor
 Yuri Zhirkov, Russian footballer
 August 23
 James Collins, Welsh footballer
 Ruta Gedmintas, Lithuanian-English actress
 Fu Haifeng, Chinese badminton player
 August 26 – Nicol David, Malaysian squash player
 August 27
 Chen Bolin, Taiwanese actor 
 Jamala, Ukrainian singer and songwriter, Eurovision Song Contest 2016 winner
 August 28
 Alfonso Herrera, Mexican actor and singer
 Lasith Malinga, Sri Lankan cricketer
 August 30 – Jun Matsumoto, Japanese singer and actor
 August 31 – Maria Flor, Brazilian actress

September 

 September 1 – José Antonio Reyes, Spanish footballer (d. 2019)
 September 2 – Kim Jung-hwan, South Korean fencer
 September 4 – Guy Pnini, Israeli basketball player
 September 5 – Priscilla Meirelles, Brazilian model, Miss Earth 2004
 September 6 – Braun Strowman, American professional wrestler and strongman
 September 9 – Zoe Kazan, American actress and screenwriter
  September 10 
 Shawn James, Guyanese-American basketball player
 Joey Votto, Canadian baseball player
 September 11 – Vivian Cheruiyot, Kenyan long-distance runner
 September 12 – Johny Hendricks, American mixed martial artist and wrestler
 September 13 – Kaoklai Kaennorsing, Thai Muay Thai kickboxer
 September 14 – Amy Winehouse, English singer (d. 2011)
 September 15 – Ashleigh McIvor, Canadian freestyle skier
 September 16 – Kirsty Coventry, Zimbabwean swimmer and politician
 September 18
 Kevin Doyle, Irish footballer
 Sasha Son, Lithuanian singer
 September 20 – Yuna Ito, American-Japanese singer and actress
 September 21
 Fernando Cavenaghi, Argentine footballer
 Maggie Grace, American actress
 Joseph Mazzello, American actor
 Anna Meares, Australian track cyclist
 September 23 
 Marcelo Melo, Brazilian tennis player
 Carly Piper, American swimmer
 September 24
 Lyndon Ferns, South African swimmer
 Randy Foye, American basketball player
 September 25
 Donald Glover, American actor
 Son Dam-bi, South Korean singer 
 September 26 – Ricardo Quaresma, Portuguese footballer
 September 27
 Fazura, Malaysian actress
 Jeon Hye-bin, South Korean actress and singer 
 September 30 – Andreea Răducan, Romanian gymnast

October

 October 1 
 Anna Drijver, Dutch actress and model
 Mirko Vučinić, Montenegrin footballer
 October 3 
 Fred, Brazilian footballer
 Tessa Thompson, American actress
 October 4 – Vicky Krieps, Luxembourgish actress
 October 5
 Jesse Eisenberg, American actor
 Nicky Hilton Rothschild, American model and socialite 
 Juan Manuel Vargas, Peruvian footballer
 October 4 – Sunette Viljoen, South African javelin thrower and cricketer
 October 9 
 Spencer Grammer, American actress
 Jang Mi-ran, South Korean weightlifter
 Tatyana Lysenko, Russian hammer thrower
 October 10 – Alyson Hau, Hong Kong radio DJ
 October 13 – Katia Winter, Swedish actress
 October 14 
 Lin Dan, Chinese badminton player 
 Betty Heidler, German hammer thrower
 October 15 – Stephy Tang, Hong Kong singer and actress
 October 16 – Loreen, Swedish pop singer and music producer, Eurovision Song Contest 2012 winner
 October 17
 Nkeirouka Ezekh, Russian curler
 Felicity Jones, English actress
 Daniel Kajmakoski, Macedonian singer and songwriter
 Ivan Saenko, Russian footballer
 October 19 – Rebecca Ferguson, Swedish model and actress
 October 20 – Alona Tal, Israeli television actress
 October 21
 Hrvoje Ćustić, Croatian footballer (d. 2008)
 Marie Marguerite, Duchess of Anjou, Venezuelan heiress and wife of Louis Alphonse of Bourbon, Duke of Anjou
 Amber Rose, American model and actress
 Aaron Tveit, American actor
 October 24 – Adrienne Bailon, American singer and actress
 October 25 – Princess Yōko of Mikasa, member of the Japanese Imperial Family
 October 27
 Dmitri Sychev, Russian footballer
 Kıvanç Tatlıtuğ, Turkish actor and model
 October 30 – Diana Karazon, Kuwaiti born-Jordanian singer

November

 November 1
 Yuko Ogura, Japanese gravure idol
 Micaela Schäfer, German model, singer, DJ and actress
 Jelena Tomašević, Serbian pop singer
 November 2 – Andreas Bourani, German singer-songwriter
 November 3 – Julie Marie Berman, American actress
 November 5 – Alexa Chung, English television presenter and model
 November 7 – Adam DeVine, American actor, voice actor, comedian, screenwriter, producer, and singer
 November 8
 Pavel Pogrebnyak, Russian footballer
 Blanka Vlašić, Croatian high jumper
 November 9 – Meseret Defar, Ethiopian long-distance runner
 November 10 – Miranda Lambert, American country singer
 November 11
 Sola Aoi, Japanese model
 Paulina Brandberg, Swedish politician
 Philipp Lahm, German footballer
 November 15 
 John Heitinga, Dutch football player and coach
 Laura Smet, French actress
 Fernando Verdasco, Spanish tennis player
 November 16 – Britta Steffen, German swimmer
 November 17
 Viva Bianca, Australian actress
 Ioannis Bourousis, Greek basketball player
 Ryan Braun, American baseball player
 Jodie Henry, Australian swimmer
 Christopher Paolini, American author
 November 18 
 Julia Ducournau, French film director and screenwriter
 Jon Johansen, Norwegian computer programmer
 November 19
 Meseret Defar, Ethiopian long distance runner
 Adam Driver, American actor
 DeAngelo Hall, American football player
 November 20 – Future, American rapper, singer, and songwriter
 November 21 – The Bella Twins, (Brie & Nikki), American professional wrestlers
 November 23 – Kamilla Rytter Juhl, Danish badminton player
 November 24 – Gwilym Lee, Welsh actor
 November 27
 Professor Green, British rapper
 Donta Smith, American basketball player
 November 28 
 Édouard Roger-Vasselin, French tennis player
 Nelson Valdez, Paraguayan footballer

December

 December 2 – Ana Lucía Domínguez, Colombian actress
 December 9 – Dariusz Dudka, Polish footballer
 December 10 – Xavier Samuel, Australian actor
 December 12 – Roni Porokara, Finnish footballer
 December 13 – Otylia Jędrzejczak, Polish swimmer
 December 14 – Íñigo Errejón, Spanish political scientist and politician
 December 15
 René Duprée, Canadian professional wrestler
 Brooke Fraser, New Zealand folk-pop and Christian musician
 Camilla Luddington, English actress
 Wang Hao, Chinese table tennis player 
 December 16 – Danielle Lloyd, British model
 December 17
 Erik Christensen, Canadian hockey player
 Sébastien Ogier, French rally driver
 December 19
 Nektarios Alexandrou, Cypriot footballer
 Laura Pomeroy, Canadian swimmer
 Matt Stajan, Canadian ice hockey player
 December 20
 Jonah Hill, American actor
 Lucy Pinder, English model
 December 21 – Steven Yeun, Korean-American actor
 December 22
 Jennifer Hawkins, Australian television personality, Miss Universe 2004
 Nathalie Péchalat, French ice dancer
 December 23 – Hanley Ramírez, Dominican baseball player
 December 25 – Gwei Lun-mei, Taiwanese actress

Deaths

January
 January 2 – Dick Emery, British comedian (b. 1915)
 January 8 – Gerhard Barkhorn, German World War II fighter ace (b. 1919)
 January 11
 Ghanshyam Das Birla, Indian industrialist and educator (b. 1894)
 Tikhon Kiselyov, Belarusian statesman in the Soviet Union, the de facto leader of the Byelorussian SSR from 1980 to 1983 (b. 1917)
 January 12 – Nikolai Podgorny, Soviet politician, Chairman of the Presidium of the Supreme Soviet of the USSR from 1965 to 1977 (b. 1903)
 January 13 – David M. Shoup, American general (b. 1904)
 January 15
 Masatane Kanda, Japanese general (b. 1890)
 Meyer Lansky, American gangster (b. 1902)
 January 17 – Doodles Weaver, American comedian (b. 1911)
 January 18 – Arturo Umberto Illia, Argentine politician and physician, 34th President of Argentina (b. 1900)
 January 20 – Garrincha, Brazilian footballer (b. 1933)
 January 21 – Howard Clark, Canadian Anglican primate (b. 1903)
 January 22 – Walter Citrine, 1st Baron Citrine, British trade unionist (b. 1887)
 January 23 
 Fred Bakewell, English cricketer (b. 1908)
 Marcolino Gomes Candau, Brazilian medical doctor, 2nd Director-General of World Health Organization (b. 1911)
 January 24
 Carmen Clemente Travieso, Venezuelan journalist and activist (b. 1900)
 George Cukor, American film director (b. 1899)
 Juan Carlos Zabala, Argentine Olympic athlete (b. 1911)
 January 26 – Bear Bryant, American football player and coach (b. 1913)
 January 27
 Georges Bidault, French Resistance leader and politician, 82nd Prime Minister of France (b. 1899)
 Louis de Funès, French actor (b. 1914)
 January 28
 Frank Forde, Australian politician, 15th Prime Minister of Australia, leader of the World War II  (b. 1890)
 Billy Fury, British musician (b. 1940)
 January 29 – Stuart H. Ingersoll, American admiral (b. 1898)

February
 February 4 – Karen Carpenter, American singer and drummer (The Carpenters) (b. 1950)
 February 6 – Eben Bartlett, American military officer and politician (b. 1912)
 February 7 – Raja Babu, Indian actor (b. 1937)
 February 8
 Harry Boot, English physicist (b. 1917)
 Maria Josefa Alhama y Valera, Spanish Roman Catholic nun and blessed (b. 1893)
 February 9 – Patriarch Khoren I Paroian (b. 1914)
 February 12
 Italo Acconcia, Italian football player and manager (b. 1925)
 Eubie Blake, American musician and songwriter (b. 1887)
 February 13 – Lorenzo Bianchi, Italian Roman Catholic cardinal (b. 1899)
 February 14 – Lina Radke, German athlete (b. 1903)
 February 19 – Alice White, American actress (b. 1904) 
 February 22 – Sir Adrian Boult, English conductor (b. 1889)
 February 23 – Herbert Howells, English composer (b. 1892)
 February 25 – Tennessee Williams, American playwright (b. 1911)
 February 27 – Nikolai Aleksandrovich Kozyrev, Russian astronomer and astrophysicist (b. 1908)
 February 28 – Winifred Atwell, British pianist (b. 1914)

March
 March 1 
 Hideo Kobayashi, Japanese author (b. 1902)
 Arthur Koestler, Austrian writer (b. 1905)
 March 3 – Hergé, Belgian comics creator (b. 1907)
 March 6 – Donald Maclean, British spy (b. 1913)
 March 7 – Igor Markevitch, Ukrainian conductor (b. 1912)
 March 8
 Sir William Walton, English composer (b. 1902)
 Chabuca Granda, Peruvian singer and composer (b. 1920)
 March 9
 Faye Emerson, American actress (b. 1917)
 Ulf von Euler, Swedish physiologist, Nobel Prize laureate (b. 1905)
 March 11 – Will Glickman, American playwright (b. 1910)
 March 14 – Maurice Ronet, French film actor and director (b. 1927)
 March 15 
 Dame Rebecca West, British writer (b. 1892)
 Josep Lluís Sert, Spanish architect and urbanist (b. 1902)
 March 16 – Arthur Godfrey, American radio and television broadcaster and entertainer (b. 1903)
 March 17 – Haldan Keffer Hartline, American physiologist, Nobel Prize laureate (b. 1903)
 March 18
 Umberto II of Italy, 4th and last King of Italy (b. 1904)
 Ivan Vinogradov, Russian mathematician (b. 1891)
March 20 – Maria Babanova, Soviet and Russian actress (b. 1900)
March 22 – Blanton Collier, American football coach (b. 1906)
 March 25 – Bob Waterfield, American football player (Los Angeles Rams) and a member of the Pro Football Hall of Fame (b. 1920)
 March 26 – Anthony Blunt, British spy and art historian (b. 1907)
 March 27
 Elsie Eaves, American civil engineer (b. 1898)
 James Hayter, British actor (b. 1907)
 March 30
 Gunnar Bigum, Danish actor (b. 1914)
 Lisette Model, Austrian-American photographer (b. 1901)
 March 31 – Stephen Murray, British actor (b. 1912)

April
 April 3 – Jimmy Bloomfield, English football player and manager (b. 1934)
 April 4
Jacqueline Logan, American actress (b. 1901)
Gloria Swanson, American actress (b. 1899)
 April 11 – Dolores del Río, Mexican actress (b. 1904)
 April 12 
 Desmond Bagley, English novelist (b. 1923)
 Jørgen Juve, Norwegian football player and journalist (b. 1906)
 April 13 – Gloria Marín, Mexican actress (b. 1919)
 April 15
 Gyula Illyés, Hungarian poet and novelist (b. 1902)
 Corrie ten Boom, Dutch resistance fighter (b. 1892)
 April 19 – Jerzy Andrzejewski, Polish author (b. 1909)
 April 20
 Mária Mezei, Hungarian actress (b. 1909)
 Walther Nehring, German general (b. 1892)
 Pedro Quartucci, Argentine boxer and actor (b. 1905)
 April 21 – Walter Slezak, Austrian-American actor (b. 1902)
 April 22 – Earl "Fatha" Hines, American musician (b. 1903)
 April 23
 Buster Crabbe, American actor and athlete (b. 1908)
 Selena Royle, American actress and writer (b. 1904)
 April 30
 George Balanchine, Russian-American dancer and choreographer (b. 1904)
 Joel Henry Hildebrand, American chemist (b. 1881)
 Muddy Waters, American musician (b. 1913)

May
 May 1
 George Hodgson, Canadian Olympic swimmer (b. 1893)
 Joseph Ruttenberg, Russian-born American cinematographer (b. 1889)
 Arthur D. Struble, American admiral (b. 1894)
 May 2 
 Pridi Banomyong, Thai politician and professor, 7th Prime Minister of Thailand (b. 1900)
 Ernesto de la Guardia, 32nd President of Panama (b. 1904)
 Norm Van Brocklin, American football player (Los Angeles Rams) and coach (Minnesota Vikings) and a member of the Pro Football Hall of Fame (b. 1926)
 May 5 – John Williams, British actor (b. 1903)
 May 8 – John Fante, American writer (b. 1909)
 May 13 – Allauddin, Pakistan actor (b. 1923)
 May 14 
 Miguel Alemán Valdés, 46th President of Mexico (b. 1900)
 Roger J. Traynor, American judge (b. 1900)
 May 15 – James Van Der Zee, American photographer (b. 1886)
 May 18 – Frank Aiken, Irish politician, former Tánaiste and Foreign Minister of Ireland (b. 1898)
 May 19 – Jean Rey, 2nd President of the European Commission (b. 1902)
 May 21 – Kenneth Clark, British art historian (b. 1903)
 May 22
 Albert Claude, Belgian biologist, recipient of the Nobel Prize in Physiology or Medicine (b. 1899)
 King Idris of Libya (b. 1889)
 John Penrose, British actor (b. 1914)
 May 23 – John Seward Johnson I, American art collector (b. 1895)
 May 25 – Sid Daniels, British merchant marine worker, last surviving crewmember of the RMS Titanic (b. 1895)
 May 29 – Arvīds Pelše, Latvian historian, Soviet politician and functionary (b. 1899)
 May 31 – Jack Dempsey, American heavyweight champion boxer (b. 1895)

June
 June 1
 Prince Charles, Count of Flanders (b. 1903)
 Ernest Graves, American actor (b. 1919)
 Anna Seghers, German writer (b. 1900)
 June 2
 Stan Rogers, Canadian musician (b. 1949)
 Julio Rosales, Filipino Roman Catholic cardinal (b. 1906)
 June 4 – Gordon Kahl, American tax protester and cop-killer (b. 1920)
 June 6 – Mahmoud el-Meliguy, Egyptian actor and screenwriter (b. 1910)
 June 8 – Miško Kranjec, Slovenian writer (b. 1908)
 June 10 – Larry Hooper, American singer (b. 1917)
 June 11 – George Douglas, American actor (b. 1903)
 June 12 – Norma Shearer, Canadian-born American actress (b. 1902)
 June 15
 Mario Casariego y Acevedo, Spanish-born Guatemalan Roman Catholic cardinal (b. 1909)
 Srirangam Srinivasarao, Indian Telugu poet (b. 1910)
 June 17 
 George Benson, British actor (b. 1911)
 Peter Mennin, American composer and teacher (b. 1923)
 June 18
 Marianne Brandt, German industrial designer (b. 1893)
 Robert Riddles, British locomotive engineer (b. 1892)
 June 23 – Osvaldo Dorticós Torrado, Cuban politician, 21st President of Cuba (suicide) (b. 1919)
 June 24 – Charles Phelps Taft II, American politician, son of President William Howard Taft (b. 1897)
 June 25 – Alberto Ginastera, Argentine composer (b. 1916)
 June 30
 Choo Seng Quee, Singaporean football coach (b. 1914)
 Mary Livingstone, American radio and voice actress (b. 1908)

July
 July 1 – Buckminster Fuller, American architect (b. 1895)
 July 2 – László Budai, Hungarian footballer (b. 1928)
 July 4
 Dr. John Bodkin Adams, British suspected serial killer (b. 1899)
 Ted Berrigan, American poet (b. 1934)
 July 5 – Harry James, American musician and band leader (b. 1916)
 July 7 – Herman Kahn, American futurist (b. 1922)
 July 9 – Keith Wickenden, British politician (b. 1932)
 July 10
 Werner Egk, German composer (b. 1901)
 Estrellita Castro, Spanish singer and actress (b. 1908)
 July 11 – Ross Macdonald, American-Canadian writer (b. 1915)
 July 12 – Chris Wood, British rock musician, lead singer and guitarist of the band Traffic (b. 1944)
 July 14 – Jack MacBryan, English cricketer (b. 1892)
 July 15 – Eddie Foy, Jr., American actor (b. 1905)
 July 16
 Michel Micombero, Burundian military officer and statesman, 8th Prime Minister and 1st President of Burundi (b. 1940)
 Samson Raphaelson, American screenwriter (b. 1894)
 July 17 – Roosevelt Sykes, American blues musician (b. 1906)
 July 20 – Frank Reynolds, American journalist (b. 1923)
 July 23 – Georges Auric, French composer (b. 1899)
 July 25 – Jerome Moross, American composer (b. 1913)
 July 26
 Larry Gains, Canadian boxer (b. 1901)
 Charlie Rivel, Spanish Catalan circus clown (b. 1896)
 July 29
 Luis Buñuel, Spanish filmmaker (b. 1900)
 Rocco Chinnici, Italian judge (b. 1925)
 Raymond Massey, Canadian actor (b. 1896)
 David Niven, British soldier and actor (b. 1910)
 July 30
 Howard Dietz, American lyricist (b. 1896)
 Lynn Fontanne, British actress (b. 1887)

August
 August 1 – Lilian Mercedes Letona, Salvadoran guerrilla (b. 1954)
 August 2 – James Jamerson, American musician (b. 1936)
 August 3 – Carolyn Jones, American actress (b. 1930)
 August 4 – Jobriath, American rock musician and actor (b. 1946)
 August 5
 Bart Bok, Dutch-born American astronomer (b. 1906)
 Judy Canova, American actress (b. 1913)
 August 6 – Klaus Nomi, German singer and performance artist (b. 1944)
 August 10 – José Baptista Pinheiro de Azevedo, Portuguese military officer and political figure, 104th Prime Minister of Portugal (b. 1917)
 August 11 – Mamie Phipps Clark, American psychologist (b. 1917)
 August 16
 Earl Averill, American baseball player and member of the MLB Hall of Fame (b. 1902)
 Heinz Warneke, American sculptor (b. 1895)
 August 17 – Ira Gershwin, American lyricist (b. 1896)
 August 18 – Sir Nikolaus Pevsner, German-born British art historian (b. 1902)
 August 21 – Benigno Aquino Jr., Filipino politician (b. 1932)
 August 24 – Scott Nearing, American political activist, economist, and simple living advocate (b. 1883)
 August 26 – Nazir Ahmed Khan, Pakistan-born Indian actor, director and producer (b. 1904)
 August 28
 Jan Clayton, American actress and singer (b. 1917)
 José Bergamín, Spanish writer (b. 1895)
 August 29 – Simon Oakland, American actor (b. 1915)

September
 September 1 – Henry M. "Scoop" Jackson, American politician (suffered an aortic aneurysm after giving a news conference condemning the shooting down of KAL 007) (b. 1912)
 September 2 – Feri Cansel, Turkish-Cypriot actress (b. 1944)
 September 8 – Ibrahim Abboud, 4th Prime Minister and 1st President of Sudan (b. 1900)
 September 9 – Leo Lemay, American-born Solomonian Roman Catholic bishop (b. 1909)
 September 10
 Felix Bloch, Swiss-born physicist, Nobel Prize laureate (b. 1905)
 Jon Brower Minnoch, heaviest man who ever lived (b. 1941)
 Dai Rees, British golfer (b. 1913)
 John Vorster, 8th Prime Minister of South Africa and 5th President of South Africa (b. 1915)
 September 12 – Sabin Carr, American Olympic athlete (b. 1904)
 September 14 – Robert Leahy Fair, American lieutenant general (b. 1923)
 September 16 
 Gunnar Olsson, Swedish actor (b. 1904)
 José María Reyes Mata, Honduran revolutionary leader (b. 1943)
 September 17 – Humberto Sousa Medeiros, Portuguese-born American Roman Catholic clergyman (b. 1915)
 September 18 – María Esther Podestá, Argentine actress (b. 1896)
 September 19 – Bruno Pittermann, Austrian Social Democratic politician, 19th Vice-Chancellor of Austria (b. 1905)
 September 20
 Prince Friedrich Christian of Schaumburg-Lippe (b. 1906)
 Ángel Labruna, Argentine footballer and manager (b. 1918)
 September 21 – Xavier Zubiri, Spanish philosopher (b. 1898)
 September 25 – King Leopold III of Belgium (b. 1901)
 September 26 – Tino Rossi, French singer (b. 1907)
 September 29 – Alan Moorehead, Australian-born English war correspondent and historian (b. 1910)
 September 30 – William Elliott, American actor (b. 1934)

October
 October 4 – Andrés Córdova, acting President of Ecuador, Leader of the World War II (b. 1892)
 October 5 – Earl Tupper, American businessman (b. 1907)
 October 6 – Terence Cooke, American Roman Catholic cardinal, archbishop and servant of God (b. 1921)
 October 7
 George O. Abell, American astronomer, professor at UCLA, science popularizer, and skeptic (b. 1927)
 Christophe Soglo, Beninese military officer and political leader, 3rd President of Dahomey (b. 1909)
 October 8
 Joan Hackett, American actress (b. 1934)
 Ruben Rausing, Swedish entrepreneur, founder of Tetra Pak (b. 1895)
 October 10
 Georgia Cozzini, American socialist politician (b. 1915)
 Sir Ralph Richardson, British actor (b. 1902)
 October 12 – Prince Nayef bin Abdullah (b. 1914)
 October 13 – Ajitesh Bandopadhyay Indian actor, playwright and director (b. 1933) 
 October 14
 Alice Lardé de Venturino, Salvadoran poet and writer (b. 1895) 
 Paul Fix, American actor (b. 1901)
 October 15 – Pat O'Brien, American actor (b. 1899)
 October 16 − George Liberace, American musician and television performer (b. 1911)
 October 17 – Raymond Aron, French philosopher, sociologist and political scientist. (b. 1905)
 October 19 
 Maurice Bishop, Grenadian politician and revolutionary, 2nd Prime Minister of Grenada (b. 1944)
 Dorothy Stuart Russell, Australian-British pathologist (b. 1895)
 Carel Willink, Dutch painter (b. 1900)
 October 20 – Peter Dudley, British actor (b. 1935)
 October 21 – Joseph P. Lordi, American government official (b. 1919)
 October 23
 Jessica Savitch, American journalist (b. 1947)
 Toru Takahashi, Japanese race car driver (b. 1960)
 Lakshman Wickremasinghe, Sri Lankan Anglican bishop (b. 1927)
 October 26 
 Mike Michalske, American football player (Green Bay Packers) and a member of the Pro Football Hall of Fame (b. 1903)
 Alfred Tarski, Polish-born American logician and mathematician (b. 1901)
 October 28
 Roderick Gill, Irish cricketer (b. 1919)
 Otto Messmer, American cartoonist (b. 1892)
 October 31 – George S. Halas, American football player and coach; member of the Pro Football Hall of Fame (b. 1895)

November
 November 3 – Alfredo Antonini, American conductor and composer (b. 1901)
 November 7 – Germaine Tailleferre, French composer (b. 1892)
 November 8 – Betty Nuthall, English tennis champion (b. 1911)
 November 13 – Aliagha Aghayev, Azerbaijani actor (b. 1913)
 November 14
 Barney Bubbles, English graphic artist (b. 1942)
 Tómas Guðmundsson, Icelandic poet (b. 1901)
 November 15 – John Le Mesurier, British actor (b. 1912)
 November 19 
 Tom Evans, English musician and songwriter (b. 1947)
 Carolyn Leigh, American lyricist (b. 1926)
 November 20
 Marcel Dalio, French actor (b. 1900)
 Richard Loo, Chinese-born American actor (b. 1903)
 November 22 − Michael Conrad, American actor (b. 1925)
 November 23 – Waheed Murad, Pakistani actor, film producer, writer and director (b. 1938)
 November 27 
 Jorge Ibargüengoitia, Mexican novelist and playwright (b. 1928)
 Ángel Rama, Uruguayan writer and literary critic (b. 1926)
 Marta Traba, Colombian-Argentine art critic and writer (b. 1930)
 Rosa Sabater, Spanish pianist (b. 1929)
 November 28 – Christopher George, American actor (b. 1931)
 November 30 
 George Headley, West Indian cricketer (b. 1909)
 Richard Llewellyn, British writer (b. 1906)

December
 December 2 – Fifi D'Orsay, Canadian-American actress and singer (b. 1904)
 December 5
 Robert Aldrich, American film director (b. 1918)
 John Robinson, British Anglican bishop (b. 1919)
 December 6
 Lucienne Boyer, French singer (b. 1903)
 Gul Khan Nasir, Baloch politician and poet from Pakistan (b. 1914)
 December 7 – Fanny Cano, Mexican actress and producer (b. 1944)
 December 8
 Keith Holyoake, New Zealand politician, 26th Prime Minister of New Zealand (b. 1904)
 Slim Pickens, American actor (b. 1919)
 December 9
 Tito Junco, Mexican actor (b. 1915)
 David Rounds, American actor (b. 1930)
 December 11 – Sir Neil Ritchie, British general (b. 1897)
 December 13
 Leora Dana, American actress (b. 1923)
 Mary Renault, English author (b. 1905)
 December 15 – David Markham, British actor (b. 1913)
 December 19 – Cameron Hall, British actor (b. 1897)
 December 20 
 Prince Moulay Abdallah of Morocco (b. 1935)
 Bill Brandt, German-British photographer and photojournalist(b. 1904)
 December 21 – Paul de Man, Belgian-born literary critic (b. 1919)
 December 23 – Colin Middleton, Northern Irish artist (b. 1910)
 December 25 – Joan Miró, Spanish painter (b. 1893)
 December 26 – Hans Liska, Austrian-German artist (b. 1907)
 December 27 – William Demarest, American actor (b. 1892)
 December 28
 Jimmy Demaret, American golf champion (b. 1910)
 Dennis Wilson, American singer, songwriter and drummer (b. 1944)

Date unknown
 Mary Cohan, Broadway composer and lyricist, daughter of George M. Cohan (b. 1909)
 Freda Simmonds, New Zealand artist (b. 1912)

Nobel Prizes

 Physics – Subrahmanyan Chandrasekhar, William Alfred Fowler
 Chemistry – Henry Taube
 Medicine – Barbara McClintock
 Literature – William Golding
 Peace – Lech Wałęsa
 Economics – Gérard Debreu

References